The Count of Monte Cristo is a 2002 American historical adventure film, which is an adaptation of the 1844 novel of the same name by Alexandre Dumas, produced by Roger Birnbaum, Gary Barber, and Jonathan Glickman, and directed by Kevin Reynolds. The film stars Jim Caviezel, Guy Pearce, Richard Harris, James Frain, Dagmara Dominczyk, and Luis Guzmán. It follows the general plot of the novel, with the main storyline of imprisonment and revenge preserved, but many elements, including the relationships between major characters and the ending, were modified, simplified, added, or removed.

The Count of Monte Cristo was released in the United States on January 25, 2002. The film was met with generally positive reviews from critics and grossed $75 million.

Plot

In 1815, Edmond Dantès, second mate of a French merchant vessel, and his friend Fernand Mondego, a representative of the shipping company, seek medical help on Elba for their ailing captain. Napoleon Bonaparte is in exile on the island. Having kept his guardians from killing the pair, Bonaparte privately requests that Edmond deliver a letter to the mainland in exchange for his physician's services. Edmond is sworn to secrecy, but Fernand witnesses the exchange. In Marseille, the company owner, Morrell, commends Edmond for his bravery, promoting him to captain over first mate Danglars, who had given Edmond explicit orders not to land at Elba. Edmond thereafter states his intention to marry his girlfriend, Mercédès, whom Fernand lusts after.

Envious of Edmond’s good fortune, Fernand and Danglars inform on Edmond regarding Bonaparte's letter, which reveals information that could be used to aid Bonaparte's escape from Elba. Villefort, the city's chief magistrate, has Edmond arrested, but initially prepares to exonerate him until he learns the letter is addressed to his own father, Monsieur Clarion, a Bonapartist. He burns the letter and orders Edmond imprisoned in the Château d'If. Edmond escapes from Villefort and goes to Fernand for help, but Fernand instead turns him over to the pursuing gendarmes. Edmond is consigned to the island prison and its sadistic warden, Armand Dorleac. In exchange for persuading Mercédès that Edmond has been executed for treason and that she should take comfort in Fernand, Villefort has Fernand assassinate his father.

Six years later, Edmond is startled in his cell by an eruption in the ground revealing another prisoner, Abbé Faria, who has been imprisoned for 11 years after refusing to tell Bonaparte the whereabouts of the treasure of the Spada family. Faria has been digging an escape tunnel, but upon seeing that he is in Edmond's cell, he realizes he dug in the wrong direction. In exchange for Edmond's help digging a new tunnel, Faria educates him in a wide array of academic and martial disciplines. Faria is fatally injured in a tunnel cave-in, but before dying he gives Edmond a map to the treasure and implores him to use it only for good. Edmond escapes the prison by taking Faria's place in the disposal of his corpse, and is thrown into the sea, pulling Dorleac along with him and drowning him.

Wading ashore, Edmond encounters a band of pirates preparing to execute one of their own, Jacopo. Their leader, Luigi Vampa, decides justice and entertainment would be better served by pitting Edmond against Jacopo in a knife fight. Edmond wins but spares Jacopo, who swears himself to Edmond for life. They both work with the pirates until they arrive in Marseille. Edmond learns from Morrell, who does not recognize him, that Fernand and Danglars were complicit in his betrayal, and that Fernand and Mercédès wed shortly after Edmond was imprisoned. With Faria's map, he and Jacopo locate the treasure on the island of Montecristo. With his newfound wealth and comprehensive education, Edmond establishes himself in Parisian society as "The Count of Monte Cristo" with Jacopo as his manservant, and swears vengeance on those who conspired against him.

Edmond ingratiates himself to the Mondegos by staging the kidnap and rescue of their son, Albert. He lures Fernand, Villefort, and Danglars into a trap by letting slip the notion that he has located the treasure of Spada, and is shipping it through Marseille. His plans result in Danglars being caught red-handed in the act of theft, and Villefort being tricked into revealing his role in his father's death; both are arrested. Fernand is brought to financial ruin as Edmond has his gambling debts called in. Even though his appearance has changed dramatically, Edmond is recognized by Mercédès. Eventually, she softens him, and they rekindle their relationship. As Fernand prepares to flee, Mercédès reveals the only reason she married him was that she was pregnant with Albert, who is actually Edmond's son.

Edmond ambushes Fernand in the ruins of his family's country estate, having led him to believe that the treasure of Spada would be waiting for him. Albert intervenes when Edmond attempts to kill Fernand, but Mercédès tells him of his true parentage. Fernand attempts to flee, but changes his mind upon realizing that Edmond has everything and he has nothing, and challenges Edmond to a fight to the death; Edmond prevails.

Edmond purchases Château d'If, intending to raze it, but instead leaves it standing as he swears to Faria to use his vast resources for good and departs with his new family.

Cast

Filming locations
About 80% of the movie was filmed on the island of Malta, where the capital of Valletta stood in for Marseilles. The fortified city of Vittoriosa, part of the Grand Harbour of Valletta, was chosen for its strong resemblance to the Port of Marseilles in the early 19th century. The waterfront stretch of Vittoriosa known as Xatt Ir-Risq and Fort St Elmo featured specifically in the "Marseilles" scenes. The Grand Harbour had the added advantage of being one of a very few ports deep enough to allow the huge period sailing ships brought from the UK to dock. Saint Mary's Tower on the island of Comino 
was used for the exteriors of the Château d'If; the Azure Window of Gozo also makes an appearance in the scenes set on the island of Montecristo.

In Ireland, locations included Powerscourt Estate, which stood in for the estate which Dantès buys and where he hosts his grand introduction to Paris society, while Kilruddery House appears as Mondego's home early in the film. The climactic fight scene between Dantès and Mondego was filmed near Slane in County Meath.

Reception
On Rotten Tomatoes the film holds an approval rating of 73% based on 143 reviews, with an average rating of 6.71/10. The website's critics consensus reads: "Though it may not reach for any new artistic heights, The Count of Monte Cristo is an old-fashioned yet enjoyable swashbuckler". At Metacritic, the film has a weighted average score of 61 out of 100, based on 33 critics, indicating "generally favourable reviews". Audiences polled by CinemaScore gave the film an average grade of "A" on an A+ to F scale.

Roger Ebert gave the film 3 stars out of 4, writing: "The Count of Monte Cristo is a movie that incorporates piracy, Napoleon in exile, betrayal, solitary confinement, secret messages, escape tunnels, swashbuckling, comic relief, a treasure map, Parisian high society and sweet revenge, and brings it in at under two hours, with performances by good actors who are clearly having fun. This is the kind of adventure picture the studios churned out in the Golden Age--so traditional it almost feels new".

Soundtrack

The official soundtrack for the film was composed and conducted by Edward Shearmur and performed by the London Metropolitan Orchestra.

References

External links

 
 
 
 
 

2002 films
2000s action adventure films
2000s prison films
2002 romantic drama films
Films set in 1815
American action adventure films
American prison drama films
American romantic drama films
American films about revenge
British action adventure films
British prison drama films
British romantic drama films
British films about revenge
Irish action films
Irish adventure films
Irish romantic drama films
English-language Irish films
Films scored by Edward Shearmur
Films based on The Count of Monte Cristo
Films directed by Kevin Reynolds
Films set in Marseille
Films set in Rome
Films shot in Malta
Films produced by Roger Birnbaum
Spyglass Entertainment films
American swashbuckler films
Touchstone Pictures films
Treasure hunt films
Films about prison escapes
2000s English-language films
2000s American films
2000s British films
Depictions of Napoleon on film